Beedi Kunjamma is a 1982 Indian Malayalam film, directed and produced by K. G. Rajasekharan. The film stars Srividya, M. G. Soman and Seema in the lead roles. The film has musical score by A. T. Ummer.

Cast
Srividya
M. G. Soman
Seema

Soundtrack
The music was composed by A. T. Ummer and the lyrics were written by Poovachal Khader.

References

External links
 

1982 films
1980s Malayalam-language films
Films directed by K. G. Rajasekharan